Erkan Kaş (born 10 September 1991) is a Turkish footballer who plays for Çorum.

Personal life
Kaş is of Kosovan descent, and was called up to the Kosovo national football team.

References

External links
 
 
 

1991 births
People from Niksar
Turkish people of Kosovan descent
Living people
Turkish footballers
Turkey youth international footballers
Turkey B international footballers
Association football midfielders
Beşiktaş J.K. footballers
Çaykur Rizespor footballers
Kardemir Karabükspor footballers
Sivasspor footballers
Kayserispor footballers
Yeni Malatyaspor footballers
Şanlıurfaspor footballers
Süper Lig players
TFF First League players
TFF Second League players